The insurgency in Jammu and Kashmir, also known as the Kashmir insurgency, is an ongoing separatist militant insurgency against the Indian administration in Jammu and Kashmir, a territory constituting the southwestern portion of the larger geographical region of Kashmir, which has been the subject of a territorial dispute between India and Pakistan since 1947.

Jammu and Kashmir, long a breeding ground of separatist ambitions, has been wracked by the insurgency since 1989. Although the failure of Indian governance and democracy lay at the root of the initial disaffection, Pakistan played an important role in converting the latter into a fully-developed armed insurgency. Some insurgent groups in Kashmir support complete independence, whereas others seek the region's accession to Pakistan.

More explicitly, the roots of the insurgency are tied to a dispute over local autonomy. Democratic development was limited in Kashmir until the late 1970s, and by 1988, many of the democratic reforms provided by the Indian government had been reversed and non-violent channels for expressing discontent were limited, which caused a dramatic increase in support for insurgents advocating violent secession from India. In 1987, a disputed election held in the erstwhile state of Jammu and Kashmir created a catalyst for the insurgency when it resulted in some of the state's legislative assembly members forming armed insurgent groups. In July 1988, a series of demonstrations, strikes, and attacks on the Indian government effectively marked the beginning of the insurgency in Jammu and Kashmir, which escalated into the most severe security issue in India during the 1990s.

Pakistan, with whom India has fought three major wars over the Muslim-majority region, has officially claimed to be giving only its "moral and diplomatic" support to the separatist movement. The Pakistani Inter-Services Intelligence has been accused by both India and the international community of supporting and supplying arms as well as providing training to "mujahideen" militants in Jammu and Kashmir. In 2015, a former President of Pakistan, Pervez Musharraf, admitted that the Pakistani state had supported and trained insurgent groups in Kashmir throughout the 1990s. Several new militant groups with radical Islamist views emerged during this time and changed the ideological emphasis of the movement from that of plain separatism to Islamic fundamentalism. This occurred partly due to the influence of a large number of Muslim jihadist militants who began to enter the Indian-administered Kashmir Valley through Pakistani-controlled territory across the Line of Control following the end of the Soviet–Afghan War in the 1980s. India has repeatedly called on Pakistan to end its alleged "cross-border terrorism" in the region.

The conflict between militants and Indian security forces in Kashmir has led to a large number of casualties; many civilians have also died as a result of being targeted by various armed militant groups. According to official figures released in the Jammu and Kashmir assembly, there were 3,400 cases of disappearance and more than 47,000 people dead (including 7,000 police personnel and 20,000 militants) because of the conflict . The insurgency has also forced the large-scale migration of non-Muslim minority Kashmiri Hindus out of the Kashmir Valley. Since the revocation of the special status of Jammu and Kashmir in August 2019, the Indian military has intensified its counter-insurgency operations in the region.

History

1947–1982 

After independence from colonial rule India and Pakistan were engaged in a war over the princely state of Jammu and Kashmir. At the end of the war India controlled the southern portion of the princely state. While there were sporadic periods of violence there was no organised insurgency movement.

During this period legislative elections in the state of Jammu and Kashmir were first held in 1951 and Sheikh Abdullah's secular party stood unopposed. He was an instrumental member in the accession of the state to India.

However, Sheikh Abdullah would fall in and out of favour with the central government and would often be dismissed only to be re-appointed later on. This was a time of political instability and power struggle in Jammu and Kashmir, and it went through several periods of president's rule by the Federal Government.

1982–2004 

After Sheikh Abdullah's death, his son Farooq Abdullah took over as Chief Minister of Jammu and Kashmir. Farooq Abdullah eventually fell out of favour with the Central Government and the Prime Minister Indira Gandhi, who had his government toppled with the help of his brother-in-law G. M. Shah. GM Shah was the chief minister during the 1986 Anantnag Riots until he was removed and replaced by Farooq Abdullah. A year later, Abdullah reached an accord with the new Prime Minister Rajiv Gandhi and announced an alliance with the Indian National Congress for the elections of 1987. The elections were allegedly rigged in favour of Abdullah.

Most commentators state that this led to the rise of an armed insurgency movement composed, in part, of those who unfairly lost the elections. Pakistan supplied these groups with logistical support, arms, recruits and training.

In the second half of 1989 the alleged assassinations of the Indian spies and political collaborators by the Jammu Kashmir Liberation Front was intensified. Over six months more than a hundred officials were killed to paralyse government's administrative and intelligence apparatus. The daughter of then interior affairs minister, Mufti Mohammad Sayeed was kidnapped in December and four militants had to be released for her release. This event led to mass celebrations all over the valley. Farooq Abdullah resigned in January after the appointment of Jagmohan Malhotra as the Governor of Jammu and Kashmir. Subsequently, J&K was placed under Governor's Rule under Article 92 of state constitution.

Under JKLF's leadership on 21–23 January large scale protests were organised in the Kashmir Valley. As a response to this largely explosive situation paramilitary units of BSF and CRPF were called. These units were used by the government to combat Maoist insurgency and the North-Eastern insurgency. The challenge to them in this situation was not posed by armed insurgents but by the stone pelters. Their inexperience caused at least 50 casualties in Gawkadal massacre. In this incident the underground militant movement was transformed into a mass struggle. To curb the situation AFSPA (Armed Forces Special Powers Act) was imposed on Kashmir in September 1990 to suppress the insurgency by giving armed forces the powers to kill and arrest without warrant to maintain public order. During this time the dominant tactic involved killing of a prominent figure in a public gathering to push forces into action and the public prevented them from capturing these insurgents. This sprouting of sympathisers in Kashmir led to the hard-line approach of Indian army.

With JKLF at forefront large number of militant groups like Allah Tigers, People's League and Hizb-i-Islamia sprung up. Weapons were smuggled on a large scale from Pakistan. In Kashmir JKLF operated under the leadership of Ashfaq Majid Wani, Yasin Bhat, Hamid Shiekh and Javed Mir. To counter this growing pro-Pakistani sentiment in Kashmir, Indian media associated it exclusively with Pakistan.

JKLF used distinctly Islamic themes to mobilise crowds and justify their use of violence. They sought to establish an Islamic democratic state where the rights of minorities would be protected according to Quran and Sunna and economy would be organised on the principles of Islamic socialism.

The Indian army has conducted various operations to control and eliminate insurgency in the region such as Operation Sarp Vinash, in which a multi-battalion offensive was launched against militants from groups like Lashkar-e-Taiba, Harkat-ul-Jihad-e-Islami, al-Badr and Jaish-e-Mohammed who had been constructing shelters in the Pir Panjal region of Jammu and Kashmir over several years. The subsequent operations led to the death of over 60 militants and uncovered the largest network of militant hideouts in the history of insurgency in Jammu and Kashmir covering 100 square kilometers.

Cultural changes
Cinema houses were banned by some militant groups. Many militant organisations like Al baqr, People's league, Wahdat-e-Islam and Allah Tigers imposed restrictions like banning cigarettes, restrictions on Kashmiri girls.

2004–11 

Beginning in 2004 Pakistan began to end its support for insurgents in Kashmir. This happened because militant groups linked to Kashmir twice tried to assassinate Pakistani President General Pervez Musharraf. His successor, Asif Ali Zardari has continued the policy, calling insurgents in Kashmir "terrorists", although it is unclear if Pakistan's intelligence agency, the Inter-Services Intelligence, thought to be the agency aiding and controlling the insurgency is following Pakistan's commitment to end support for the insurgency in Kashmir. Despite the change in the nature of the insurgency from a phenomenon supported by external forces to a primarily domestic-driven movement the Indian government has continued to send large numbers of troops to the Indian border. There have been widespread protests against the Indian army presence in Kashmir.

Once the most formidable face of Kashmir militancy, Hizbul Mujahideen is slowly fading away as its remaining commanders and cadres are being taken out on a regular interval by security forces. Some minor incidents of grenade throwing and sniper firing at security forces notwithstanding, the situation is under control and more or less peaceful. A record number of tourists including Amarnath pilgrims visited Kashmir during 2012. On 3 August 2012, a top Lashkar-e-Taiba militant commander, Abu Hanzulah involved in various attacks on civilians and security forces was killed in an encounter with security forces in a village in Kupwara district of north Kashmir.

2012–present

According to Indian Army data quoted by Reuters, at least 70 young Kashmiris joined the insurgency in 2014, army records showed, with most joining the terrorist organization Lashkar-e-Taiba, which was responsible for carrying out the 2008 Mumbai attacks. Two of the new recruits have doctorates and eight were post graduates, the army data showed. According to BBC, despite a Pakistani ban on militant activity in Kashmir in 2006, its militants continue to attempt infiltration into Indian-administered Kashmir. These attempts were curtailed however when people living along the Line of Control which divides Indian and Pakistani Kashmir started to hold public protests against the activities of the insurgent groups.

In 2016, violence erupted in the aftermath of the killing of Hizbul Mujahideen militant Burhan Wani by security forces. Since then, militants belonging to the Jaish-e-Mohammed group carried out the 2016 Uri attack and the 2018 Sunjuwan attack. In February 2019, the Pulwama attack occurred, in which 40 CRPF personnel were killed by a Jaish-e-Mohammed suicide bomber. Border skirmishes between India and Pakistan occurred multiple times in 2013, 2014–2015, 2016–2018 and most notably in 2019. The latest skirmish ended with a ceasefire in February 2021.

In August 2019, the special status of Jammu and Kashmir was revoked, following which the Indian Army intensified its counter-insurgency operations. In June 2020, Doda district was declared militancy free while Tral was declared free from Hizbul Mujahideen militants. In July, a Kashmir police tweet from an official twitter handle said "no resident of #Srinagar district in terrorist ranks now". On 27 June 2021, a day after the successful completion of discussions between the Indian Prime Minister and Jammu and Kashmir political leaders, a drone based attack was reported at the technical area of Jammu Airport which is under the control of the IAF. In the first three months of 2022, there was a 100% increase in the number of Indian soldiers killed by Kashmiri militants compared to the same period in 2021.

Motivations behind the insurgency

Rigging of 1987 Assembly elections 

Following the rise of Islamisation in the Kashmir valley, during the 1987 state elections, various Islamic anti-establishment groups including Jamaat-e-Islami Kashmir were organised under a single banner named Muslim United Front (MUF), that is largely current Hurriyat. MUF's election manifesto stressed the need for a solution to all outstanding issues according to Simla Agreement, work for Islamic unity and against political interference from the centre. Their slogan was wanting the law of the Quran in the Assembly. But the MUF won only four seats, even though it had polled 31% votes in the election. However, the elections were widely believed to be rigged, changing the course of politics in the state. The insurgency was sparked by the apparent rigging of state elections in 1987.

Human rights abuses 

Indian troops entered the valley to quell the insurgency after it began. Some analysts have suggested that the number of Indian troops in Jammu and Kashmir is close to 600,000 although estimates vary and the government refuses to release official figures. The troops have been accused and held accountable for several humanitarian abuses and have engaged in mass extrajudicial killings, torture, rape and sexual abuse.

Indian security forces have been implicated in many reports for enforced disappearances of thousands of Kashmiris whereas the security forces deny having their information and/or custody. This is often in association with torture or extrajudicial killing. Human right activists estimate the number of disappeared to be over eight thousand, last seen in government detention. The disappeared are believed to be dumped in thousands of mass graves across Kashmir. A State Human Rights Commission inquiry in 2011, has confirmed there are thousands of bullet-ridden bodies buried in unmarked graves in Jammu and Kashmir. Of the 2730 bodies uncovered in 4 of the 14 districts, 574 bodies were identified as missing locals in contrast to the Indian governments insistence that all the graves belong to foreign militants.

Military forces in Jammu and Kashmir operate under impunity and emergency powers granted to them by the central government. These powers allow the military to curtail civil liberties, creating further support for the insurgency.

The insurgents have also abused human rights, driving away Kashmiri Pandits from the Kashmir Valley, an action that has been called ethnic cleansing The government's inability to protect the people from both its own troops and the insurgency has further eroded support for the government.

Amnesty International accused security forces of exploiting the Armed Forces Special Powers Act (AFSPA) that enables them to "hold prisoners without trial". The group argues that the law, which allows security to detain individuals for as many as two years "without presenting charges, violating prisoners' human rights". The Army sources maintain that "any move to revoke AFSPA in Jammu and Kashmir would be detrimental to the security of the Valley and would provide a boost to the terrorists."

Former Indian Army Chief General V. K. Singh rejected the accusations that the action was not taken in the cases of human rights violations by Army personnel. On 24 October 2010, he has said that 104 Army personnel had been punished in Jammu and Kashmir in this regard, including 39 officers. He also said that 95% of the allegations of human rights abuses against Indian Army were proved to be false, of which he remarked, had apparently been made with the "ulterior motive of maligning the armed forces". However, according to Human Rights Watch, the military courts in India, in general, were proved to be incompetent to deal with cases of serious human rights abuses and were responsible in covering up evidence and protecting the involved officers. Amnesty International in its report in 2015, titled "Denied"-Failures in Accountability in Jammu and Kashmir, says, "...with respect to investigations, an inquiry that is conducted by the same authority accused of the crime raises serious questions about the independence and impartiality of those proceedings", adding that according to the international law, an independent authority that is not involved in the alleged violations has to investigate such crimes.

These human rights violations are said to have contributed to the rise of resistance in Kashmir.

ISI's role 
The Pakistani Inter-Services Intelligence has encouraged and aided the Kashmir independence movement through an insurgency due to its dispute on the legitimacy of Indian rule in Kashmir, with the insurgency as an easy way to keep Indian troops distracted and cause international condemnation of India. Former Pakistan President General Pervez Musharraf in Oct 2014 said during TV interview, "We have source (in Kashmir) besides the (Pakistan) army...People in Kashmir are fighting against (India). We just need to incite them."

The Federal Bureau of Investigation (FBI), in their first ever open acknowledgement in 2011 in US Court, said that the Inter-Services Intelligence (ISI) sponsors and oversees separatist militant groups in Kashmir.

In 2019, Prime Minister of Pakistan Imran Khan publicly discouraged Pakistani people from going to Kashmir to do a jihad. People who went to Kashmir will do an "injustice to the Kashmiri people". Most of the Pakistani militants who had crossed the border over the years and were caught by the Indian security forces were found to belong to the Punjab province of Pakistan.

Mujahideen influence 
After the Mujahideen victory in the Soviet–Afghan War, Mujahideen militants, under the Operation Tupac with the aid of Pakistan, slowly infiltrated Kashmir with the goal of spreading a radical Islamist ideology to wage Jihad against India in the region.

Religion 
The majority of the people of Jammu and Kashmir practise Islam. Indian-American journalist Asra Nomani states that while India itself is a secular state, Muslims are politically, culturally and economically marginalised when compared to Hindus in India as a whole. The government's decision to transfer 99 acres of forest land near the Amarnath Temple in Kashmir division to a Hindu organisation (for setting up temporary shelters and facilities for Hindu pilgrims) solidified this feeling and led to one of the largest protest rallies in Jammu and Kashmir.

Other motivations

Psychological 
Psychologist Waheeda Khan, explaining the rebellious nature of the Kashmiris, says that because of the tense situations in the valley from the 1990s, the generation gap between parents and young generations has increased. Young generations tend to blame their parents for failing to do anything about the political situation. So they start experimenting with their own aggressive ways to show their curbed feelings and would go against any authority. A prominent psychiatrist of the valley, Margoob, described that children/teenagers are much more vulnerable to passionate actions and reactions, since the young minds are yet to completely develop psychological mechanisms. When they assume that they are "pushed against the wall", they get controlled by the emotions without bothering about the consequences. Also young people easily identify themselves with the "group" rather than with their individual identities. It leads to psychological distress which causes antisocial behaviour and aggressive attitude. Often, this situation gets worsened by the availability of weapons and people becoming familiar to violence after having exposed to conflict for so long. Waheeda Khan remarks, the major concern is that generations of children who are experiencing long-term violence in their lives, may reach adulthood perceiving that violence is a fair means of solving ethnic, religious, or political differences.

Economic
High unemployment and lack of economic opportunities in Kashmir are also said to have intensified the struggle.

Stone pelting 

Since the 2008 protests and 2010 unrest, the turmoil has taken a new dimension when people, particularly youngsters of the Kashmir valley have started pelting stones on security forces to express their aggression and protest for the loss of freedom. In turn they get attacked by the armed personnel with pellets, rubber bullets, sling shots and tear gas shells. This leads to eye-injuries and several other kind of injuries to many people. Security forces also face injuries, and sometimes get beaten up during these events. According to Waheeda Khan, most of the 'stone-pelters' are school and college going students. Large number of these people get arrested during these events for allegedly resorting to stone pelting, after which some of them are also tortured. According to political activist Mannan Bukhari, Kashmiris made stone, an easily accessible and defenseless weapon, their weapon of choice for protest.

Kashmiri senior journalist Parvaiz Bukhari remarked:The summer of 2010 witnessed a convulsion in the world's most militarized zone, the Indian-controlled part of Kashmir, an unprecedented and deadly civil unrest that is beginning to change a few things on the ground. [...] Little known and relatively anonymous resistance activists emerged, organizing an unarmed agitation more fierce than the armed rebellion against Indian rule two decades earlier. And apparently aware of the post 9/11 world, young Kashmiris, children of the conflict, made stones and rocks a weapon of choice against government armed forces, side-stepping the tag of a terrorist movement linked with Pakistan. The unrest represents a conscious transition to an unarmed mass movement, one that poses a moral challenge to New Delhi's military domination over the region.

Human rights abuses by militants and army 

Islamic separatist militants are accused of violence against the Kashmir populace. On the other hand, Indian army has also allegedly committed serious crimes like using pellet guns, torture, killing and rape etc., although many court cases have happened on that. The militants have kidnapped and killed many civil servants and suspected informers. Tens of thousands of Kashmiri Pandits have been forced to emigrate as a result of continued violence by the majority. Estimates of the displaced vary from 170,000 to 700,000. Thousands of Kashmiri Pandits had to move to Jammu because of targeted attacks by Islamic radical organizations.

Notable insurgences 

 Exodus of Kashmiri Hindus
 July and August 1989 – 3 CRPF personnel and politician Mohd. Yusuf Halwai of NC/F were killed.
 1989 kidnapping of Rubaiya Sayeed daughter of the then Home Minister of India Mufti Sayeed.
 Gawkadal massacre- Central Reserve Police Force opened fire on a group of Kashmiri protestors, killing 50.
 Sopore massacre- Killing of 55 Kashmiri civilians by Border security force(BSF)
 Bijbehara massacre- Massacre of 51 protestors by BSF.
 1995 kidnapping of western tourists in Jammu and Kashmir – Six foreign trekkers from Anantnag district were kidnapped by Al Faran. One was beheaded later, one escaped, and the other four remain missing, presumably killed.
 1997 Sangrampora massacre – On 22 March 1997, seven Kashmiri Pandits were killed in Sangrampora village in the Budgam district.
 Wandhama massacre – In January 1998, 24 Kashmiri Pandits living in the village of Wandhama were massacred by Pakistani militants. According to the testimony of one of the survivors, the militants dressed themselves as officers of the Indian Army, entered their houses and then started firing blindly. The incident was significant because it coincided with former US president Bill Clinton's visit to India and New Delhi highlighted the massacre to prove Pakistan-supported militancy in Kashmir .
 1998 Prankote massacre – 26 Hindu villagers of Udhampur district were killed by militants.
 1998 Champanari massacre – 25 Hindu villagers killed on 19 June 1998 by Islamic militants.
 2000 Amarnath pilgrimage massacre – 30 Hindu pilgrims massacred by militants.
 Chittisinghpura massacre – 36 Sikhs massacred by LeT militants though some allegations on Indian security forces exist too. (unclear)
 2001 Jammu and Kashmir legislative assembly bombing – On 1 October 2001, a bombing at the Legislative Assembly in Srinagar killed 38.
 2002 Raghunath temple attacks – First attack occurred on 30 March 2002 when two suicide bombers attacked the temple. Eleven persons including three security forces personnel were killed and 20 were injured. In second attack, the fidayeen suicide squad attacked the temple second time on 24 November 2002 when two suicide bombers stormed the temple and killed fourteen devotees and injured 45 others.
 2002 Qasim Nagar massacre – On 13 July 2002, armed militants believed to be a part of the Lashkar-e-Toiba threw hand grenades at the Qasim Nagar market in Srinagar and then fired on civilians standing nearby killing 27 and injuring many more.
 2003 Nadimarg Massacre – 24 Hindus killed in Nadimarg, Kashmir on 23 March 2003 by Lashkar-e-Taiba militants.
 20 July 2005 Srinagar bombing – A car bomb exploded near an armoured Indian Army vehicle in the famous Church Lane area in Srinagar killing 4 Indian Army personnel, one civilian and the suicide bomber. Militant group Hizbul Mujahideen, claimed responsibility for the attack.
 Budshah Chowk attack – A militant attack on 29 July 2005 at Srinigar's city centre, Budshah Chowk, killed 2 and left more than 17 people injured. Most of those injured were media journalists.
 Assassination of Ghulam Nabi Lone – On 18 October 2005, suspected Kashmiri militants killed Jammu and Kashmir's then education minister Ghulam Nabi Lone. Militant group called Al Mansurin claimed responsibility for the attack. Abdul Ghani Lone, a prominent All Party Hurriyat Conference leader, was assassinated by unidentified gunmen during a memorial rally in Srinagar. The assassination resulted in wide-scale demonstrations against the Indian forces for failing to provide enough security cover for Lone.
 2006 Doda massacre – On 3 May 2006, militants massacred 35 Hindus in Doda and Udhampur districts in Jammu and Kashmir.
 On 12 June 2006, one person was killed and 31 were wounded when militants hurled three grenades on Vaishnodevi shrine-bound buses at the general bus stand.
 2014 Kashmir Valley attacks – There were four attacks on 5 December 2014 on army, police and civilians resulted in 21 deaths and several injured. Their motive was to disrupt the ongoing assembly elections.
 2016 Uri attack – Four armed militants sneaked into an army camp and lobbed grenades onto tents causing massive fire culminating in the death of 19 military personnel.
 2018 Sunjuwan attack - On 10 February 2018, Jaish-e-Mohammad militants attacked Sunjuwan Army Camp in Jammu and Kashmir. 6 Indian army soldiers, 4 militants, 1 civilian died and 11 were injured.
 2019 Pulwama attack - On 14 February 2019, Jaish-e-Mohammad militants attacked a convoy of CRPF men killing 46 personnel and injuring 20.

Tactics

India 
Over time the Indian government has increasingly relied on military presence to control the insurgency. The military has allegedly committed human rights violations. The government would often dissolve assemblies, arrest elected politicians and impose president's rule. The government also rigged elections in 1987. In recent times there have been signs that the government is taking local elections more seriously. The government has also funneled development aid to Kashmir and Kashmir has now become the biggest per capita receiver of Federal aid.

Pakistan 
The Pakistani central government originally supported, trained and armed the insurgency in Kashmir, sometimes known as "ultras" (extremists), however after groups linked to the Kashmiri insurgency twice attempted to assassinate president Pervez Musharraf, Musharraf decided to end support for such groups. His successor, Asif Ali Zardari has continued the policy, calling insurgents in Kashmir "terrorists".

But the Pakistani Inter-Services Intelligence hasn't followed the lead of the government and has continued its support for insurgent groups in Kashmir In 2008, 541 people died due to insurgency, The Economist called it the lowest in two decades. The report cited a reduction in the support for militants by Pakistan and war fatigue among the Kashmiris as the reasons for the reduction in casualty figures.

Insurgents 
Since around 2000, the insurgency has become far less violent and has instead taken on the form of protests and marches. Certain groups have also chosen to lay down their arms and look for a peaceful resolution to the conflict.

Groups 
The different insurgent groups have different aims in Kashmir. Some want complete independence from both India and Pakistan, others want unification with Pakistan and still others just want greater autonomy from the Indian government.

A 2010 survey found that 43% of the people in J&K and 44% of the people in AJK would favour complete independence from both India and Pakistan, with support for the independence movement unevenly distributed across the region.

Militant groups
Over the last two years, the militant group, Lashkar-e-Toiba has split into two factions: Al Mansurin and Al Nasirin. Another new group reported to have emerged is the "Save Kashmir Movement". Harkat-ul-Mujahideen (formerly known as Harkat-ul-Ansar) and Lashkar-e-Toiba are believed to be operating from Muzaffarabad, Azad Kashmir and Muridke, Pakistan respectively. 

Other less well known groups are the Freedom Force and Farzandan-e-Milat. A smaller group, Al-Badr, has been active in Kashmir for many years and is still believed to be functioning. All Parties Hurriyat Conference, an organisation that uses moderate means to press for the rights of the Kashmiris, is often considered as the mediator between New Delhi and insurgent groups.

Al-Qaeda 
It is unclear if Al Qaeda has a presence in Jammu and Kashmir. Donald Rumsfeld suggested that they were active and in 2002 the SAS hunted for Osama bin Laden in Jammu and Kashmir. Al Qaeda claims that it has established a base in Jammu and Kashmir. However, there has been no evidence for any of these assertions. The Indian army also claims that there is no evidence of Al Qaeda presence in Jammu and Kashmir. Al Qaeda has established bases in Pakistani administered Kashmir and some, including Robert Gates have suggested that they have helped to plan attacks in India.

Casualties 
According to Sumantra Bose in his book, Kashmir: Roots of Conflict, Paths to Peace, around 40,000 (Indian estimates) to 80,000 (Hurriyat estimates) civilians, militants and security personnel died from the time period of 1989 to 2002 in both Kashmir Valley and Jammu region. More than 4,600 security personnel, 13,500 civilians and 15,937 militants including 3,000 from outside Jammu and Kashmir (mostly Pakistanis and some Afghans) were killed in this fourteen-year period. Also in this period, 55,538 incidents of violence were recorded. Indian forces engaged in counter insurgency operations captured around 40,000 firearms, 150,000 explosive devices, and over 6 million rounds of assorted ammunition. Jammu and Kashmir Coalition of Civil Society posits a figure of 70,000 deaths, most of them civilians. Since 2003, the annual fatalities have been declining. The districts with the most incidents of killing were Kupwara, Baramulla, Poonch, Doda, Anantnag and Pulwama.

Surrender and rehabilitation policy 
Surrendering in Jammu and Kashmir has been institutionalized over the years. The 1990s saw some surrender policies, while in the 2000s, there was a policy for militants belonging to Indian administered Jammu and Kashmir and another for Pakistan administered territory. The first surrender policy for militants in Kashmir was launched on 15 August 1995. It was a copy of the policies already there for Naxalites.

Appeals to surrender 
Appeals to surrender are made by security forces to militants at encounter sites as well. Some attempts are successful, while others are not. Mothers and other family members have made videos urging their child turned militant to surrender to the security forces. Sometimes the family member is brought to the encounter site and urged to talk to their children through loudspeakers to surrender.

References

Bibliography
 

Conflicts in 1989
History of the Republic of India
Guerrilla wars
Kashmir
Islamist insurgencies
India–Pakistan relations
Kashmir conflict
Proxy wars
Rebellions in India
Terrorism in Pakistan
Terrorism in Jammu and Kashmir
Wars involving India
20th-century conflicts
21st-century conflicts
1980s conflicts
1990s conflicts
2000s conflicts
2010s conflicts
2020s conflicts